Nonkuleleko 'Nkuli' Sibeko (born 24 June 1980), is a South African actress, producer and screenwriter.

Personal life
Sibeko was born on 24 June 1980 in South Africa. She graduated with a degree in Theatre and Performance at the University of Cape Town.

She is married to fellow actor Thembile Botman.

Career
In 2005, she joined with the SABC1 sitcom City Ses'la and played the role as "Dana Roberts". The role became very popular, where she continued to play the role until the end of fourth season in 2010. In 2009, she won the Best Supporting Actress Award in TV Comedy category at the South African Film and Television Awards (SAFTA) for this role. Before that won, she was nominated for Best Actress - TV Comedy category at SAFTAs in both 2006 and 2007. In the meantime, she appeared in the second season of the SABC1 drama series Society with a minor role as "Dineo's Nanny". Then she starred as "Zanele" in the Mzansi Magic sitcom It's for Life.

In 2012, she made a supportive role of "Dana" in the SABC1 comedy series Ses'Top La where she reprised her role in the second season as well. In 2014, she made a guest role in the Mzansi Magic serial Samsokolo. In 2014 she co-wrote the script for the SABC1 reality competition series The Perfect Sishebo Show. She was nominated twice for Best Achievement in Scriptwriting in TV Comedy category for the serials Kota Life Crisis and Puppet Nation ZA at the 2016 SAFTAs. For the script of Puppet Nation ZA, Sibeko was again nominated Best Achievement in Scriptwriting at the 2017 SAFTAs.

She is the executive producer at Jack&Jill Productions where she produced the 2013 short film Lexus and 2018 film Table Manners.

Filmography

References

External links
 IMDb

1980 births
Living people
South African film actresses
South African television actresses